Polycera is a genus of sea slugs, specifically nudibranchs, shell-less marine gastropod molluscs in the family Polyceridae.

Polycera is the type genus of the family Polyceridae.

Species 
Species in the genus Polycera include:
 Polycera abei (Baba, 1960)
 Polycera alabe Collier & Farmer, 1964
 Polycera anae Pola, Sánchez-Benítez & Ramiro, 2014 
 Polycera atra MacFarland, 1905 orange-spike polycera
 Polycera aurantiomarginata García-Gómez & Bobo, 1984
 Polycera aurisula Er. Marcus, 1957
 Polycera capensis Quoy & Gaimard, 1824
 Polycera chilluna Er. Marcus, 1961
 Polycera elegans (Bergh, 1894) alternate representation of Greilada elegans
 Polycera faeroensis Lemche, 1929
 Polycera fujitai Baba, 1937
 Polycera hedgpethi Er. Marcus, 1964
 Polycera herthae Ev. Marcus & Er. Marcus, 1963
 Polycera hummi Abbott, 1952
 Polycera janjukia Burn, 1962
 Polycera japonica Baba, 1949
 Polycera kaiserae Hermosillo & Valdés, 2007
 Polycera maculata Pruvot-Fol, 1951
 Polycera maddoxi Miller, 2005
 Polycera manzanilloensis Ortea, Espinosa & Camacho, 1999
 Polycera marplatensis Franceschi, 1928
 Polycera melanosticta Miller, 1996
 Polycera norvegica Sørensen, Rauch, Pola & Malaquias, 2020
 Polycera odhneri Er. Marcus, 1955
 Polycera parvula (Burn, 1958)
 Polycera picta Risbec, 1928
 Polycera priva Er. Marcus, 1959
 Polycera quadrilineata (O. F. Müller, 1776)
 Polycera risbeci Odhner, 1941
 Polycera rycia Er. Marcus & Ev. Marcus, 1970
 Polycera sp. twin-crowned nudibranch
 Polycera tricolor Robilliard, 1971 three-color polycera
 Polycera xicoi Ortea & Rolán, 1989
Species brought into synonymy
 Polycera atlantica Pruvot-Fol, 1956: synonym of Polycera elegans (Bergh, 1894)
 Polycera citrina Alder & Hancock, 1841: synonym of Palio dubia (M. Sars, 1829)
 Polycera conspicua Allan, 1932: synonym of Polycera capensis Quoy & Gaimard, 1824
 Polycera cooki Angas, 1864: synonym of Paliolla cooki (Angas, 1864)
 Polycera cornigera Adams & Reeve in Adams, 1848: synonym of Ceratosoma trilobatum (J.E. Gray, 1827)
 Polycera cristata Alder, 1841: synonym of Ancula gibbosa (Risso, 1818)
 Polycera dubia M. Sars, 1829: synonym of Palio dubia (M. Sars, 1829)
 Polycera gnupa Er. Marcus & Ev. Marcus, 1967: synonym of Polycera hedgpethi Er. Marcus, 1964
 Polycera horrida Hesse, 1872: synonym of Aegires punctilucens (d'Orbigny, 1837)
 Polycera incognita (Ortea, Espinosa & Caballer, 2005): synonym of Kankelibranchus incognitus Ortea, Espinosa & Caballer, 2005
 Polycera lessoni d'Orbigny, 1837: synonym of Palio dubia (M. Sars, 1829)
 Polycera lessonii d'Orbigny, 1837: synonym of Palio dubia (M. Sars, 1829)
 Polycera lineatus Risso, 1826: synonym of Polycera quadrilineata (O. F. Müller, 1776)
 Polycera mediterranea Bergh, 1879: synonym of Polycera quadrilineata (O. F. Müller, 1776)
 Polycera messinensis Odhner, 1941: synonym of Polycera elegans (Bergh, 1894)
 Polycera modesta Lovén, 1846: synonym of Palio dubia (M. Sars, 1829)
 Polycera nigrocrocea Barnard, 1927: synonym of Polycera capensis Quoy & Gaimard, 1824
 Polycera nigrolineata Dautzenberg & Durouchoux, 1913: synonym of Polycera quadrilineata (O. F. Müller, 1776)
 Polycera nigropicta Ihering, 1885: synonym of Polycera quadrilineata (O. F. Müller, 1776)
 Polycera nothus (Johnston, 1838): synonym of Palio nothus (Johnston, 1838)
 Polycera ocellata Alder & Hancock, 1842: synonym of Palio nothus (Johnston, 1838)
 Polycera ornata d'Orbigny, 1837: synonym of Polycera quadrilineata (O. F. Müller, 1776)
 Polycera pudica Lovén, 1846: synonym of Palio dubia (M. Sars, 1829)
 Polycera punctilucens d'Orbigny, 1837: synonym of Aegires punctilucens (d'Orbigny, 1837)
 Polycera salamandra Labbé, 1931: synonym of Polycera quadrilineata (O. F. Müller, 1776)
 Polycera tabescens Risbec, 1928: synonym of Tambja limaciformis (Eliot, 1908)
 Polycera typica W. Thompson, 1840: synonym of Polycera quadrilineata (O. F. Müller, 1776)
 Polycera varians M. Sars, 1840: synonym of Polycera quadrilineata (O. F. Müller, 1776)
 Polycera webbi d'Orbigny, 1839: synonym of Felimare picta (Schultz in Philippi, 1836)
 Polycera zeylanica Kelaart, 1858: synonym of Plocamopherus ceylonicus (Kelaart, 1858)
 Polycera zosterae O’Donoghue, 1924: synonym of Palio dubia (M. Sars, 1829)
Nomine dubia
 Polycera funerea Pruvot-Fol, 1930 
 Polycera pruvotae Risbec, 1953

References

External links 
 

Polyceridae
Gastropod genera
Taxa named by Georges Cuvier